The Magnificent Brute is a 1921 American silent drama film directed by Robert Thornby and starring Frank Mayo, Dorothy Devore and Percy Challenger.

Cast
 Frank Mayo as Victor Raoul
 Dorothy Devore as Yvonne
 Percy Challenger as Fontaine
 Alberta Lee as Mrs. Fontaine
 J. Jiquel Lanoe as Marquis Courtière 
 Eagle Eye as Indian 
 Charles Edler as Kendrick
 Dick Sutherland as Randall
 Eli Stanton as 	Woodsman
 Buck Moulton as Woodsman
 Lillian Ortez as 	Maid

References

Bibliography
 Connelly, Robert B. The Silents: Silent Feature Films, 1910-36, Volume 40, Issue 2. December Press, 1998.
 Munden, Kenneth White. The American Film Institute Catalog of Motion Pictures Produced in the United States, Part 1. University of California Press, 1997.

External links
 

1921 films
1921 drama films
1920s English-language films
American silent feature films
Silent American drama films
Films directed by Robert Thornby
American black-and-white films
Universal Pictures films
1920s American films